Kūh-Zibad its peak also called Tir Mahi is a mountain in the province of Razavi Khorasan, city of Gonabad District Zibad in the eastern part of the country, 700 km east of the capital Tehran. The width at the base is 5.5 km. 
The terrain around the Qole-e Tir Mahi and Kuh-e zibad is mainly hilly. The highest point in the vicinity is 2775 meters above sea level, 17.7 km southeast of Qole-e Tir mahi.  Around Kuh-e Zibad is very sparsely populated, with 5 inhabitants per square kilometer. Nearest society zibad, 8.5 km north of Kuh-e Zibad. The neighborhood around Kuh-e Zibad is barren with little or vegetation. In the neighborhood around the Kuh-e Zibad are unusually many named mountains and valleys. 
A cold steppe climate prevailing in the region.
This mountain had been referred in some historical book such as shahnameh in Davazdah Rokhwar as the Zibad mountain and its eastern part is called black mountain or kuh Gonabad. The long mountain range is called Qohestan and it extends from Bajestan to Birjand near the border with Afghanistan. This mountain range separates south khorasan from Razavi Khorasan, part of this mountain range near Kakhk is called black mountain or kuh e gonabad.

See also

Zibad Castle
Zibad
Davazdah Rokh
Bajestan
Ferdous
Birjand

Sources 
Article in Persian language. Parssea magazine,2011 
Geography and tribe and minority in khorasan,Mohammad Ajam, research published 1992, university of Imam Sadegh,Tehran.

References 

https://web.archive.org/web/20140429163019/http://amordadnews.com/neveshtehNamyesh.aspx?NId=6010

Gallery 

Populated places in Gonabad County
Tourist attractions in Razavi Khorasan Province